The Higher Population Council-General Secretariat (HPC/GS) is a specialized agency of the Jordanian government, acting as the authority for all reproductive health issues and programs in Jordan.  The HPC is headquartered in Amman, Jordan.  It was established on December 3, 2002 with a mandate to deal with the population challenges facing Jordan and to enhance the implementation of the National Population Strategy.

The HPC is chaired by the prime minister, and has the following members:
Minister of Labor
Minister of Education
Minister of Awqaf and Islamic Affairs
Minister of Planning
Minister of Health
Minister of Social Development
Chairman of the Higher Council of Youth Head of the Parliamentary Committee for Population and Development
Representative from the Jordan Hashemite Fund for Human Development
Director of the Housing and Urban Development Corporation 
Secretary General of the Jordanian National Commission for Women
Secretary General of the National Council for Family Affairs
President of the Jordanian Association for Family Planning and Protection
Two members from the private sector

External links
 HPC website
 Prime Ministry of Jordan website
 

Divisions and subsidiaries of the prime ministry (Jordan)
Organizations promoting population moderation